The 2006 Africa Cup of Nations was the 25th edition of the Africa Cup of Nations, the association football championship of Africa. It was hosted by Egypt. Just like in 2004, the field of sixteen teams was split into four groups of four. Egypt won its fifth championship, beating Ivory Coast in the final 4–2 in a penalty shootout after a goalless draw.

Host selection 
Bids :
 Algeria
 Egypt
 Ivory Coast
 Libya

The organization of the 2006 Africa Cup of Nations was awarded to Egypt on 24 October 2002 by the CAF Executive Committee meeting in Cairo, Egypt. Voters had a choice between four countries : Algeria, Egypt, Ivory Coast and Libya.

This marks the fourth time that Egypt has hosted the African Cup after 1959, 1974 and 1986.

It also coincides with the celebration of the 50th anniversary of the foundation of CAF.

Qualification 

For the 2006 Africa Cup of Nations, qualification was done through the CAF's qualification process for the 2006 FIFA World Cup. Whereas only the winner of each group qualified for the World Cup, the top 3 finishers in each of the five qualification groups gained entry into the Africa Cup of Nations. The exception was qualification group 3, which contained hosts Egypt. Since Egypt qualified for the Africa Cup of Nations automatically as the hosts, the final berth was instead awarded to the fourth-place finishers, Libya.

2006 also marked the first time that the defending champion did not automatically qualify for the finals. Tunisia, 2004's champion, qualified for the Cup of Nations by winning their group in the qualification process.

Participating teams 

 
 
 
 
  (qualified as hosts)
 
 
 
 
 
 
 
 
  (holders)

Squads

Venues

Group stage 
The top two teams of each group (highlighted in green) progress to the quarter-finals.

All times local: EET (UTC+2)

Group A

Group B

Group C

Group D

Knockout stage

Quarter-finals

Semi-finals

Third-place match

Final

Goalscorers 
5 goals
  Samuel Eto'o

4 goals

  Ahmed Hassan
  Pascal Feindouno
  Francileudo Santos

3 goals

  Emad Moteab
  Flávio
  Didier Drogba

2 goals

  Mohamed Aboutrika
  Albert Meyong
  Ousmane Bangoura
  Kaba Diawara
  Obafemi Martins
  Henri Camara
  Mamadou Niang

1 goal

  Norberto Maurito
  Geremi
  Lomana LuaLua
  Tresor Mputu
  Hossam Hassan
  Mido
  Amr Zaki
  Baba Adamu
  Matthew Amoah
  Sambégou Bangoura
  Arouna Koné
  Bakari Koné
  Yaya Touré
  Abdusalam Khames
  Garba Lawal
  Mikel John Obi
  Victor Obinna
  Christian Obodo
  Taye Taiwo
  Issa Ba
  Souleymane Camara
  Papa Bouba Diop
  Mohamed Kader
  Chérif Touré Mamam
  Selim Benachour
  Riadh Bouazizi
  Karim Haggui
  James Chamanga
  Christopher Katongo
  Elijah Tana
  Benjani Mwaruwari

1 own goal

  Abdel-Zaher El-Saqqa (against Congo DR)
  Issah Ahmed (against Zimbabwe)

CAF Team of the Tournament 
Goalkeeper
  Essam El Hadary

Defenders
  Rigobert Song
  Wael Gomaa
  Emmanuel Eboué
  Taye Taiwo

Midfielders
  Stephen Appiah
  Mohamed Aboutrika
  Ahmed Hassan
  Pascal Feindouno

Forwards
  Didier Drogba
  Samuel Eto'o

See also 
 Cairo
 Egyptian Soccer Cup

External links 

 BBC coverage
 Details at RSSSF
 A guide to the teams

 
Africa Cup of Nations tournaments
International association football competitions hosted by Egypt
Nations, 2006
Africa Cup
Africa Cup of Nations
Africa Cup of Nations
Africa Cup of Nations, 2006
Sport in Alexandria
Sport in Port Said
Football in Cairo